The Voice is an international reality television singing competition franchise. It is based on the reality singing competition The Voice of Holland, which was originally created by Dutch producer John de Mol and Dutch singer Roel van Velzen.

It has become a rival to the Idols franchise, The Four, Rising Star and The X Factor. Up until 2020, the franchise was owned by Talpa Network. The current owner is ITV Studios.

Originated in the Netherlands, many other countries adapted the format and began airing their own versions starting in 2010. Up till now, seven different versions of The Voice have been produced by countries/regions all around the world. Some programs still stick to the original format of the show while most of them are produced with twists of the format added.

The franchise maintains official YouTube channels called The Voice Global and La Voz Global (as the Spanish version). The channels upload compilation videos of performances from The Voice all around the world. The Voice Global channel currently has over 10 million subscribers. Other channels on YouTube such as Best of The Voice and Best of The Voice Kids also feature compilations of the performances.

History
Talpa's John de Mol Jr., creator of Big Brother, first created The Voice concept with Dutch singer Roel van Velzen. Erland Galjaard, a Dutch program director, asked John de Mol about whether he could come up with a format that went a step further than The X Factor. De Mol then came up with the idea of Blind Audition. He wanted the show's image to be about the focus on singing quality alone, so the coaches must be top artists in the music industry. The rotating chairs concept was invented by Roel van Velzen. It would also be the first talent show in which social media was actively involved.

On 17 September 2010, The Voice of Holland began to air on RTL 4 with Angela Groothuizen, Roel van Velzen, Nick & Simon, and Jeroen van der Boom as the mentor-judges (dubbed as "coaches") of the show. The show proved to be an instant success in the Netherlands.

The format was later sold to different countries, in many cases replacing a previous Endemol music contest format, Operation Triumph / Star Academy.

Original format
The show's format features five stages of competition: producers' auditions, blind auditions, battle rounds, knockouts (since 2012), and live performance shows.

Blind auditions
Contestants are aspiring singers drawn from public auditions, which are not broadcast and active recruitment. Unlike Idols and The X Factor, the producers pick fewer contestants (usually from 100, up to 200 contestants), which are deemed "the best artists", to perform in the broadcast auditions. The first televised stage is the blind auditions, in which the four coaches, all noteworthy recording artists, listen to the contestants in chairs facing away from the stage so as to avoid seeing them. If a coach likes what they hear from that contestant, they press a button to rotate their chairs to signify that they are interested in working with that contestant. If more than one coach presses their button, the contestant chooses the coach he or she wants to work with. The blind auditions end when each coach has a set number of contestants to work with. Coaches will dedicate themselves to developing their singers mentally, musically and in some cases physically, giving them advice, and sharing the secrets of their success.

Battles
The contestants who successfully pass the blind auditions proceed to the battle rounds, where the coaches put two or sometimes three of their own team members against each other to sing the same song together in front of a studio audience. After the vocal face-off, the coach must choose only one to advance. If no specific winner can be identified, either the competition turns to a game of fate via a coin toss, or the coach may combine them into a duo  throughout the rest of the competition. In rare cases the coach can also choose to advance neither one (As seen in season eight of The Voice of Holland). In some versions, there are steals where opposing coaches can steal a contestant who was voted off by their own coach by pressing their button. As in the blind auditions, if more than one coach presses their button, the contestant chooses which coach they want. Each coach has a set number of steals, usually one or two (raised to three in the seventh season of The Voice Brasil).

Knockouts
The knockout round was introduced in 2012, and is implemented in some versions. The winners of the battle rounds proceed to this round (dubbed Super-battle round/Sing-off in some versions).
 
As in the battle rounds, coaches put members (usually 2/3/4, rarely 6 or 10) of their own team members to compete against each other. This time, the contestants choose their own song to perform individually while the other watches and waits. After that, the coach chooses one to advance while the other is sent home. At the end of the knockout rounds, the strongest members of each coach's roster proceed to the live stage shows. Some versions include steals. Like in the battle round, the opposing coaches can steal a contestant who was voted off by their own coach by pressing their button. Similar to the blind auditions, if more than one coach presses their button, the contestant chooses which coach they want.

Live shows
In the final performance phase of the competition, the top contestants from each team compete against each other during a live broadcast. The television audience vote to save one contestant on each team, leaving the coach to decide on live television who they want to save and who will not move on. In the next round, the public chooses between the two artists left on each team, and the coach also has a vote that weighs equally with the public vote.

Finally, each coach will have his/her best contestant left standing to compete in the finals, singing an original song. From these four or five, one will be named "The Voice"—and will receive the grand prize of a recording contract and a cash prize. Universal Music Group is the general record company associated and affiliated with The Voice format in most countries.

Social media participation 
One of the cornerstones of The Voice format is the social media participation via Twitter, Facebook and the specially designed platform "connect". Users are able to log in via their Facebook account and retrieve background information about the show. The platform also offers the possibility to stream the show online as well as to vote, interact with friends and to discuss various topics and questions asked by the producers throughout the show.

Format variations

Blind audition twists

No conversations if no turn
Starting from the fifth season of The Voice of Holland, if all the coaches rejected one specific contestant, they would leave the stage straight away, without any conversations with the coaches, and the chairs would remain unturned. The format is currently also used in some other versions such as The Voice of Poland, Glasat na Bulgaria, The Voice Nigeria The Voice of Mongolia, The Voice Sri Lanka and The Voice UK. Other versions that used this format consist in the fifth and eighth season of Vocea României, the fourth to sixth seasons of The Voice Belgique, the sixth season of The Voice of Albania, in the second season of The Voice Afrique, from second to third season of  The Voice South Africa from sixth to eighth season of The Voice: la plus belle voix, the fourth season of The Voice of Armenia, the eighth season of Holos Krainy, the third season of The Voice Cesko Slovensko, and from fourth to eighth season of  Lietuvos Balsas. In the case of La Voz Mexico, it was first apllied from sixth to seventh season when it was still in Las Estrellas, and then in eleventh season when it was still in TV Azteca.

Block Button 

The American version introduced a new mechanism in the blind auditions on the fourteenth season: the Block button. When a coach wants to get the specific contestant but does not want another coach to do so, they may press the block button to block them from getting the contestant, and then turn around at the same time. The coach who is blocked will not know until pressing their red button and, after that, they will get the word "blocked", instead of their name in the LED floor. A coach can use the block button once in a season (the number of allowed blocks varies in other versions, which are described below), and only one block is allowed per audition. The Block twist was then applied in:

 The Voice of Italy season 5, with a slight change: the block buttons only block the coach, and the person who presses the block button only turns around by pressing the main button. It is rather risky because if only the blocked coach turns around, it is considered that no coaches turned for the contestant. This slight change was removed in season 6, where, also, the number of blocks was raised to two for each coach.
 Giọng hát Việt season 5. Starting on season 6, a coach can turn their chair first, and then press the block button to block another coach.
 The Voice Brasil season 7, where the blocks are also possible in the battles round. When the coach presses the block button, the non-turned coaches' chair lights turn blue until the blocked coach turns. Starting from season 8, the number of blocks was raised to two for each coach, only in the blinds. In season 10, block button available only during the blinds. 
 La Voz Mexico season 7. In season 8 after it acquired by TV Azteca, although the button is present, coaches were not given any blocks to use. However, it returned in season 9, with each given two blocks to use. In season 11, the blocks were increase to four per coach.
 Vocea României season 8.
 The Voice Kids of Vietnam season 6, which was the first of The Voice Kids. In season 7, the number of blocks was raised to two per coach, and when the blocked coach presses their button to turn, the chair does not turn around. However, the contestants are able to unblock the blocked coach and choose that team. In season 8, block available is reduced from two to one block per coach (as like in season 6).
 The Voice Portugal season 6. In season 8, they applied the rule of blocking a coach even when they are already turned; also, blocks are increased to two. From season 9, two coaches can be blocked in a single audition. In season 10, when the blocked coach tries to turn for the contestant, the chair won't turn but this only applies if the blocking coach pressed the block button before the blocked coach turns.
 The Voice of Greece season 5, with the number of available blocks being four for each coach.
 The Voice Belgique season 8. From season 9, block available is increased to two for every coach.
 The Voice Thailand season 7, with the number of blocks being two per coach. In season 8, the number of blocks was raised to three.
 Spanish La Voz season 6, with the number of blocks being three for each coach. When the blocked coach presses their button to turn, the chair does not turn around. In season 9, two coaches can be blocked in a single audition.
 The Voice: la plus belle voix season 8. Starting season 11, blocks given to coaches is raised to two. From season 12, a coach can block another one even after the performance, and blocked coach's chair will rotate backward to the audience.
 United States' Spanish La Voz season 1. In season 2, the number of blocks was increased to two.
 Spanish La Voz Kids season 5, with each coach given two blocks to use. When the blocked coach presses their button to turn, the chair does not turn around. In season 7, blocks given to coach raised to three with two coaches can be blocked in single audition.
 Holos Krainy season 9. Although the block button is present, the "coach name on the LED floor" isn't. Instead, when the blocked coach presses their button to turn, they will see the LED lines towards them staying red (as if they had not turned around). In season 10, the coach's name on the floor was present. In season 11, the block button was removed.
 La Voix season 7.
The Voice van Vlaanderen season 6. In season 7, the block button was removed.
 The Voice India season 3.
 Glasat na Bulgaria season 6. In season 7, when the blocked coach tries to turn around, the chair will not turn. It was removed in season 8 in which also blocks are increased to two for every coach.
 The Voice ישראל season 5.
 French The Voice Kids season 6.
 Lietuvos balsas season 7. Starting season 9, each coach has given two blocks in the entire season.
 The Voice Indonesia season 4.
 The Voice – أحلى صوت season 5.
 O Ses Türkiye season 9. The coaches can use block button indefinitely with 2 coaches can be blocked in a single audition and can be used even after the performance of the contestant.
 The Voice Hrvatska season 3.
 Filipino's The Voice Teens season 2, which was the first of The Voice Teens. The number of available blocks is two for each coach.
 Belgium-Flanders' The Voice Kids season 5, with two blocks for each coach.
 The Voice Australia season 9. The number of available blocks is two for each coach with two blocks permitted to use in a single audition, and it also has a slight difference. The coach who wants to use the block and the coach who is being blocked have to turn before any block can be used. From season 11, block button can be used even after the contestant's performance.
 The Voice of Korea season 3.
 The Voice Kids Thailand season 7.
 The Voice of Poland season 11, with two blocks for each coach, and two coaches can be blocked in one audition. In season 12, block button can be used even after a contestant's performance, but it was removed on the following season.
 The Voice UK season 10. In season 12, the block button was removed.
 Italian The Voice Senior season 1, which was the first of The Voice Senior.
 Spanish La Voz Senior season 2 and when the blocked coach presses their button to turn, the chair does not turn around.
 Portuguese The Voice Kids season 2, with two blocks per coach, and coaches can block another one after they have turned around.
 O Ses Türkiye RAP season 1.
 The Voice Kids Indonesia season 4, with two blocks for each coach.
 The Voice საქართველო season 4.
 La Voz Peru season 4, with the number of available blocks being three for each coach. Starting season 6, two blocks are permitted in a single audition.
 Peruvian La Voz Senior season 1, with the number of blocks being three for each coach, with two blocks permitted during the audition. In season 2, coaches may block another coach even after they already turned.
 The Voice of Holland season 12. Coaches can block another coach after they have turned around.
 The Voice of Finland season 11. Coaches press the block button first and then the main button for the block to be valid.
 Peruvian La Voz Kids season 4.
Lietuvos Balsas. Kartos season 1, which is the first of The Voice Generations.
The Voice of Mongolia season 3. With each coach given two blocks to use. Coaches turn their chair first, and press the block button.
La Voz Argentina season 4. With three blocks given per coach. Coaches press the block button and turn their chair.
The Voice All Stars Thailand season 1, which is the first of The Voice All Stars.
La Voz Kids Colombia season 6. With coaches can use block button indefinitely, and when the blocked coach presses their button to turn, the chair does not turn around.
La Voz Senior Colombia season 2. With coaches can use block button indefinitely, and when the blocked coach presses their button to turn, the chair does not turn around.
Peruvian La Voz Generaciones  season 1
The Voice Nigeria season 4
Filipino's The Voice Kids season 5
Russian The Voice season 11, with three blocks given every coach.
The Voice Kids Italy season 1
The Voice Chile season 4

Mute Button 

The sixth season of The Voice Kids of Vietnam had a new feature called "Mute button". As its name implies, the muted coach will not be allowed to speak, but they can still do all the kind of body language to convince the contestant to join their team. The Mute only adds excitement to the program, as contestants can still pick the muted coach. Each coach has only one Mute per audition. It was shortly removed in seventh season then returned in the next season.

Wildcard Round / The Comeback Stage 

The Wildcard round was introduced in the first two seasons of The Voice of Holland, wherein the selected failed contestants of the blind auditions were screened and would perform via radio program Radio 538. Some coaches will select if they want that contestant on their team to compete in the battles, but it was abandoned in the later seasons. It was reintroduced in the 15th season of the U.S. version where it is now called as "The Comeback Stage". On it, a fifth coach will mentor six contestants that failed to make a team in the blind auditions, and they will compete against each other in a digital companion series, with the winner securing a spot in the Top 13. Later, it was removed on the seventeenth season. This was acquired in the ninth season of The Voice of Germany, in the fourth season of The Voice Indonesia, in the second season of La Voz USA, in the seventh season of La Voz, in the tenth season of The Voice of Finland, in the seventh season of The Voice van Vlaanderen, in the third season of La Voz Argentina, in the tenth season of The Voice Brasil, in the twelfth season of The Voice of Holland, in the eleventh season of The Voice: la plus belle voix the twelfth season of Holos Krainy in the third season of The Voice Chile the ninth season of La Voix and the second season of The Voice Sri Lanka

Switch

The sixth season of Giọng hát Việt introduced The Switch. Coaches with a full team could press the Switch button to swap one contestant with another contestant that expressed interest in the coach. Each coach only has one Switch during the course of the Blind auditions. The Special coach was also introduced this season, a role that shares similarities with the U.S. version's Comeback Stage coach. Instead of turning away from the stage as usual, the special coach's chair stay towards the stage during all performances, allowing him/her to know how the contestants look like, he/she has the ability to choose unlimited contestants, unlike other coaches, and his/her selection button is still valid even when the contestant has finished his/her performance. However, the special coach can only select contestants that were not chosen by three other coaches.

No limit

In season ten of The Voice of Australia (which is later removed in Season 11 which coaches can only have 12 artists), the judges had an no limit on the number of contestants they could turn for during the blind auditions. This follows coach, Guy Sebastian, "breaking the rules" in season nine by turning for Wolf Winters after his team was already full. However in order to balance out numbers, a following round (held straight after the blind auditions) called The Cut was introduced, where the judges hold a private callback session with their team to battle for five spots in the Knockout Rounds. Each judge groups their team by specific themes and tasks each artist to perform their rendition of a chosen song before finalising their team. This rule was also applied in the eighth season of  Glasat na Bulgaria, where coaches can have unlimited contestants on their team. However, at the end of Blind Auditions, the coaches have to cut down to 14 contestants to the next round (12 in the ninth season). This also applied in the second season of The Voice Dominicana, in the tenth season of Vocea României,  in the twelfth season of The Voice of Finland and in the ninth season of Lietuvos Balsas

Battle Pass 
The eleventh season of The Voice of Australia introduced the "Battle pass". In this twist, coaches will have a new additional silver button, in addition to the four ones which coaches can press to send automatically the contestant to the battle rounds. Each coach could only press the button once in the entire blind auditions. This edition was also acquired in the fourth season of The Voice Nigeria

Battles twists
The seventh season of The Voice of Holland features non stop steal, which means that steals during the battle rounds follow a hot-seat procedure: a coach may replace his or her stolen contestant as many times as he or she likes until the end of the battles. This feature also applies in the seventh season of The Voice of Poland, the seventh season of Vocea României, fifth season of The Voice van Vlaanderen, the fifth season of The Voice Portugal, the seventh season of Holos Krainy, the sixth season of The Voice: la plus belle voix, the fourth season of The Voice of Armenia, and The Voice Ahla Sawt, the fifth season of The Voice – Norges beste stemme and The Voice ישראל, the sixth season of Giọng hát Việt, the ninth season of The Voice of Germany (dubbed "Steal Room"), in the second season of The Voice Dominicana and in the ninth season of  Glasat na Bulgaria.

Another format was introduced in the fourth season of La Voz Kids España. The remaining contestants that was saved by the coaches will proceed to the fast-paced Battle Rounds wherein the supercoach will decide who will proceed to the live semi-finals.

The fifth season of Giọng hát Việt features no-elimination, which is used only once throughout the battles when a coach does not want to eliminate one of two their contestants and wants to keep them in the next round. A coach has to ask and gets consent from both contestants. After getting consent, two contestants were retained and would become a duo (they were not a solo-contestant), combined together throughout the rest of the competition; if a coach does not get consent, they must choose only one to advance to the knockouts as the original format.

Knockouts twists
The third season of The Voice South Africa introduced a new way to conduct the Knockout round: After each contestant's solo performance, the respective coach will have to decide whether they are in the Safe Zone (which means qualified for the Battles) or the Danger Zone (at risk of elimination). Each coach can only send three contestants to the Safe Zone but also have two steals across the round. After all members from one team have concluded their performances, the coach will save a number of artists from the Danger Zone to move on to the Battles. Contestants who are sent to the Danger Zone but not chosen by their coach or get stolen by another coach will be eliminated. However, audience can also vote for the artist in the Danger Zone by televoting. This rule was then applied in the eighth season of The Voice: la plus belle voix, where six artists will be chosen for the Safe Zone, but public's vote is not included. Also, in the third season of The Voice Nigeria.

Live shows twists
The cross-battle was introduced in the semi-final round of the fourth season of The Voice of Holland. In this round, two contestants from two different teams compete against each other and the public vote determines who will advance. This also applies from the fifth until the seventh season of The Voice Brasil, from the third until the seventh season of The Voice of Greece, as well as the sixteenth season of The Voice, the second season of La Voz in the United States or also on the tenth season of The Voice, la plus belle voix in France, and also in the eighth season of Glasat na Bulgaria.

An All-Star format 

In the eighth and ninth seasons of The Voice Australia, introduced a new twist in the show which a group of former contestants from the past seasons compete also with the new talents. Diana Rouvas and Chris Sebastian from first season of the show was hailed as a grand champion in two consecutive seasons. It was applied in the tenth season of The Voice of Germany as part of their 10th anniversary season special and in the eighth season of The Voice Portugal.

On the other hand, an All-Star edition which is only for the previous candidates, was announced as mentioned by the ITV Studios' for global entertainment President Maarten Meijs last September 2020. TF1 will be the first broadcaster to air the series under of The Voice: la plus belle voix. The format was also then applied in The Voice of Finland, The Voice Thailand and  The Voice Indonesia.

Non-televised shows
There were non-televised shows as not seen in the various format of the franchise such as The Voice of the Ocean (US) with Princess Cruises, The Voice of the Sea (Italian) with Costa Cruises,  The Voice Univa and The Voice Teens Univa (Spanish) with Grupo Telecentro in México.

The Voice around the world
A combined 590 singers have won The Voice, The Voice Kids, The Voice Teens, The Voice Senior, The Voice All Stars, The Voice Rap, The Voice Generations, and The Voice Native Songs in 65 countries/regions. Each winner is given a recording contract, a monetary prize, and a title as that nation's "Voice". The first winner was Ben Saunders of The Voice of Holland. The most recent was Luis Manuel from La Voz Peru.

 Franchise with a currently airing season
 Franchise with an upcoming season
 Franchise awaiting confirmation
 Franchise with an unknown status
 Franchise that has ceased to air
 Franchise that was cancelled during production
 Original version of The Voice
 Original version of The Voice Kids
 Original version of The Voice Senior
 Original version of The Voice Teens
 Original version of The Voice RAP
 Original version of The Voice All Stars
 Original version of The Voice Generations
 Original version of The Voice Native Songs

Notes 

  The Voice of Albania is also broadcast in Kosovo. People from Kosovo are also allowed to join the show.
  The Chinese version allows people who can speak Mandarin to join starting from season 3. In 2016, there was a controversial issue between the producers of Chinese version of the series and Talpa on the copyright of The Voice of China. Therefore, the show was rebranded as Sing! China, and is no longer part of The Voice franchise.
  While La Voix is broadcast all across Canada, people from provinces outside Quebec (excluding those from the Ottawa/Gatineau area and English-speaking communities at New Brunswick) are not allowed to join the show.
  The Voice of Greece is also broadcast in Cyprus. Cypriots are also allowed to join the show.
  The Voice Angola is also broadcast in Mozambique; people from Mozambique are also allowed to join the show.
  In the Australian version of The Voice, Joel Madden served as a solo coach from season 1 to 3. From the season 4 on, he was joined by his brother Benji Madden, and became as a duo coach called "The Madden Brothers". They also have served as the coach of the Australian version of The Voice Kids. Similar in the Turkish version of The Voice, Gökhan Özoğuz also served as a solo coach from season 3 to 4, before he was joined by Hakan Özoğuz for the following 2 seasons. But then, Gökhan goes as solo coach in the later seasons.
  The Season 2 of the Turkish version of The Voice Kids was the only season which had four coaches' teams among all versions of The Voice Kids. However, the French, Indian-Hindustani, Dutch, Flemish, Spanish, German, British, Mexican, Thai, Portuguese, Peruvian, Nepalese, Kazakh, French-African, Wallonian, & Uruguayan versions of The Voice Kids have confirmed to add a fourth coach.
  The American version of The Voice is also broadcast in Canada and some Caribbean countries and territories; people from all Canadian provinces (excluding Quebec) are also allowed to join the show, as well as people from select Caribbean countries.
  South African network M-Net is not to be confused with South Korean music channel Mnet.
  Vocea României is also broadcast in Moldova; Moldovans are also allowed to join the show, provided they have a biometric passport or a visa (which is free for Moldovans).
  The Voice of Italy is also broadcast in San Marino and Vatican, but people from Vatican City are not allowed to join the show.
  The Voice – la plus belle voix is also broadcast in Luxembourg and Monaco. People from these countries can participates at the show.
  La Voz is also broadcast in Andorra. People from Andorra are also allowed to join the show.
  Although the Kazakh, Russian, and Ukrainian versions are never broadcast outside of their countries in the CIS area, people from other CIS countries (including Russia, Kazakhstan, and Ukraine) are allowed to join of those shows.
  A Supercoach was introduced in the fourth season of La Voz Kids España, wherein the remaining contestants by each coach that was saved from the battle rounds will fight in the fast-paced battle rounds wherein he/she will decide who will proceed in the next round. David Bisbal became a supercoach for season 4, but returned to his original position as a regular coach in season 5.
  Voice – Danmarks største stemme is also broadcast in Faroe Islands and Greenland. People from Faroe Islands and Greenland are also allowed to join the show.
  The Belgian-Flemish version of The Voice Kids introduced a trio coach which was the first in the whole franchise history. A trio was also featured in the first season of Lietuvos balsas. Kartos.
  La Voz Argentina is also broadcast in Uruguay. People from Uruguay are also allowed to join the show.
  In the fifteenth season of the U.S (English), the ninth season of the German, the fourth season of the Indonesian, the second season of the U.S (Spanish), the seventh season of the Spanish, the seventh season of the Belgian-Dutch, the tenth season of the Finnish, the third season of the Argentine, the tenth season of the Brazilian version, the twelfth season of Dutch and Ukrainian and the eleventh season of French version of "The Voice", a new round was created, called The Comeback Stage. It features a fifth coach, that's being Ballerini (on season 15) and Rexha (on season 16) for U.S. (English) version, Santos (on season 9), Schulte (on season 10) and Demirezer (on season 11) for German version, Tapiheru (on season 4) for Indonesian version, Mau y Ricky (on season 2) for U.S. (Spanish) version, Rodríguez (on season 7) for Spanish version, Tesoro (on season 7) for Belgian-Dutch version, Kuoppala (on season 10) for Finnish version, Mernes (on season 3) and MYA (on season 4) for Argentine version, Telo (on season 10) for Brazilian version, Typhoon and Steenwinkel (on season 12) for Dutch version, Zaritska and Matsola (on season 12) for Ukrainian version,  Leroy (on season 11) for French version, Gepe (on season 3) for Chilean version and Perera (on season 2) for Sri Lankan  version.
  In season 2 of The Voice Afrique Francophone, A'salfo and Charlotte Dipanda originally signed up to serve as coaches full-time. However, due to a postponement which made the season finished later than planned, A'salfo and Dipanda were not able to resume their duties for the last four live shows because of pre-arranged commitments. Youssoupha and Josey replaced them, respectively, and served as coaches from the Quarterfinals until the end of the season. In the third season, Youssoupha again returned as coach replacing Nayanka Bell for the live shows, because Bell was unable to return due to the COVID-19 pandemic.
  The Voice India is also broadcast in Sri Lanka. People from Sri Lanka are also allowed to join the show.
  Following the fraud scandal for season 6 of The Voice Kids Russia, the Russian channel closed the investigation by stating that there had been fraud for the winner, and announced that it canceled the results. The producer announced that the 9 finalists are all winners of this season.
  The Voice Indonesia is also broadcast in East Timor. People from East Timor are also allowed to join the show.
  United Kingdom's ITV is not to be confused with Azerbaijan's itv network. 
  US Spanish, Malta, and Sri Lanka were the countries not to feature the regular edition as the first and main franchise which had Spanish Kid, Maltese Kid, and Teen versions respectively.
  First time in the history of The Voice that a candidate winning the child version wins the adult version few years later in the same country with the same coach.
  In the 3rd season of the Turkish version featured a whole and only team that went into the finale which is first worldwide.
  Due to the Coronavirus pandemic, The Voice Teens Philippines declared team champions per coach for the first time in the history of the franchise which was Heart Salvador, Cydel Gabutero, Kendra Aguirre and Isang Manlapaz.
  For the first-decade anniversary special of The Voice France, this is the first time in the history of The Voice that there will be 5 coaches for 5 seats under the first All-Stars version. The format was then applied in Finland where it only features 3 coaches.
  For the first time in the history of The Voice, Australia is the first country to dedicate a The Voice only for members of a family who will come to sing together. 
  Longest produced series in the history of the entire franchise.

References

External links
 Talpa Media's Official website
 The Voice Global on YouTube

 
Television franchises
2010 Dutch television series debuts
2010s Dutch television series
2020s Dutch television series